Brodhead is a surname. Notable people with the surname include:

Daniel Brodhead II (c.1700-1755), American judge and first European settler of Stroudsburg, Pennsylvania
Daniel Brodhead (1736–1809), American military and political leader during the American Revolutionary War 
Eva Wilder Brodhead (1870–1915), American novelist and short story writer
Jefferson Davis Brodhead (1859–1920), member of the U.S. House of Representatives from Pennsylvania
John Curtis Brodhead (1780 -1859), U.S. Representative from New York
John Romeyn Brodhead (1814 - 1873), American historical scholar
John Brodhead (New Hampshire) (1770 - 1838), U.S. Representative from New Hampshire.
Richard Brodhead (1811 – 1863), American lawyer and politician 
Richard H. Brodhead (born 1947), president of Duke University 
William M. Brodhead (born 1941), politician from the U.S. state of Michigan

See also 

 Broadhead (surname)